Lawton S. Parker (7 April 1868 – 1954) was an American impressionist painter.

Biography
Born in Fairfield, Michigan, raised in Kearney, Nebraska, Parker studied at the Art Institute of Chicago beginning in 1886.  He traveled to France and studied at the École des Beaux-Arts. For a time, he was associated with the Giverny art colony and adopted an impressionist style. After returning to the United States, in 1892 he was appointed professor of the St. Louis School of Fine Arts. He became director of art at Beloit College in 1893, and president of the New York School of Art in 1898-99. Beginning 1903, he resided in Chicago and taught at the Art Institute.

Among his sitters for portraits were Martin A. Ryerson, J. Ogden Armour, N. W. Harris, Harry P. Judson, and Peter S. Grosscup. He received the silver medal at the Saint Louis Exposition in 1904; gold medals at the International Exposition, Munich, in 1905, and at the Paris Salon in 1913 (the first American so honored); and was awarded the medal of honor at the Panama–Pacific International Exposition in 1915. Parker was also the president of the Rodin Studios corporation, which developed an artists' cooperative housing of the same name in New York City.

He died at age 86 in Pasadena, California.

References

1868 births
1954 deaths
19th-century American painters
American male painters
20th-century American painters
American Impressionist painters
American alumni of the École des Beaux-Arts
People from Lenawee County, Michigan
People from Kearney, Nebraska
Académie Carmen alumni
19th-century American male artists
20th-century American male artists